Fort Crittenden, originally Camp Crittenden, was a United States Army post built in 1867 three miles from Sonoita, Arizona along Sonoita Creek. It was established for campaigning against the Apache and to protect American pioneers in the area.

History
Fort Crittenden was established August 10, 1867 at the head of Davidson Canyon, a half mile from the site of Fort Buchanan, which was built in 1856 and abandoned after the Battle of Fort Buchanan in 1865. The fort was named for Colonel Thomas L. Crittenden, who was the commander of the 5th Division in the Army of the Ohio at Shiloh, the Left Wing of the Army of the Cumberland at Stones River, and the XXI Corps at Chickamauga during the American Civil War. The fort was closed on June 1, 1873. Deteriorating adobe walls and dirt mounds mark the site which is on private property.

References

External links
 
 

Arizona Territory
Buildings and structures in Santa Cruz County, Arizona
Crittenden
History of Santa Cruz County, Arizona
1867 establishments in Arizona Territory